Maggie Butt is a British poet and novelist.

Background
Maggie Butt  is an ex-journalist and BBC TV producer turned poet and novelist. Her latest poetry collection, everlove, was published in April 2021 by The London Magazine. Her novel, The Prisoner's Wife was published in 2020  under her maiden name Maggie Brookes. It was published by imprints of Penguin Random House in the UK, Australia, New Zealand, USA and Canada  and also in the Czech Republic, Poland, Portugal, Mexico  and the Netherlands.

She has been a Royal Literary Fund fellow and Associate Professor at Middlesex University, where she taught creative writing for 30 years. Her poetry has been published in international magazines  and anthologies and been turned into choreography and a mobile phone app as well as set to music. She has judged many poetry competitions.

After completing an English degree, Maggie (then Brookes) became a newspaper reporter at the Kingsbridge Gazette , and Hendon Times moving to BBC TV as a documentary writer, producer and director. She later returned to her first love of poetry and fiction, completing a PhD in creative writing from Cardiff University.

Maggie Butt's first poetry pamphlet, Quintana Roo, was published by Acumen Publications in 2003. Her first full collection of poetry, Lipstick, was published in March 2007 by Greenwich Exchange; a launch event was held at Keats House in Hampstead, North London. Her edited collection of essays, Story - The Heart of the Matter, was also published by Greenwich Exchange in October 2007. An e-book and MP3, "I Am The Sphinx", were published by Snakeskin online poetry journal in 2009. Her collection of short poems, "petite", was published by Hearing Eye in 2010, and turned into a dance piece "Ashes" by choreographer Dr Lesley Main.

Ally Pally Prison Camp, published in June 2011 by Oversteps Books, charts the use of Alexandra Palace in North London as a 'concentration camp' for civilian enemy aliens during the First World War. It tells the story of the internees through black and white photographs, the paintings of internee George Kenner, extracts from memoirs and letters, and Maggie Butt's own poems. The poems and stories from Ally Pally Prison Camp have been recorded and brought alive for visitors to Alexandra Palace in a locative mobile phone app called Time Stood Still produced by Dr Helen Bendon.

Sancti Clandestini - Undercover Saints, published November 2012 by Ward-Wood Publications, is a fully illustrated poetry collection, which proposes some alternative, imaginary saints, including the Patron Saints of liars, looters, rank outsiders, compulsive hoarders, old dogs and infidel girls. These undercover Patron Saints were illustrated by the staff and students of Middlesex University's BA Hons Illustration course, from famous and established artists to emerging talents.'If the proof of a poem is in the richness of response it provokes, the illustrations here are that response made visible - a testimony to the subtle layers in this tender but incisive poetry.' Philip Gross

Degrees of Twilight  was published by The London Magazine in July 2015.  These poems use history, memory, work and travel as lenses to examine the inevitable pains and sharp pleasures at the heart of our transient lives.

Dr Maggie Butt was Chair of the National Association of Writers in Education (NAWE) from 2007-2012, and founding Principal Editor of the peer reviewed journal Writing in Practice.

Maggie Butt lives in North London. She is married with two grown-up daughters.

Books
Quintana Roo, Acumen Publications 2003
Lipstick, Greenwich Exchange 2007
Story - The Heart of the Matter, Greenwich Exchange 2007
Petite, Hearing Eye 2010
Ally Pally Prison Camp, Oversteps Books 2011
Sancti Clandestini - Undercover Saints’’, Ward-Wood 2012Degrees of Twilight, The London Magazine, 2015The Prisoner's Wife, Penguin Random House 2020everlove'', The London Magazine, 2021

References

External links 
 Maggie Butt's Website
 Profile at Middlesex University
 Profile at Royal Literary Fund
 Profile at University of Kent

English women poets
Living people
Year of birth missing (living people)